Taiz is a city in southwestern Yemen. It is the capital of Taiz Governorate. With a population of over 600,000 in 2005, it was the largest city in Yemen at the time.

Due to the ongoing campaign as part of Yemen's civil war, Taiz is currently a battleground and a war zone.  Once known as the "cultural capital of Yemen", the war has bestowed a new name on Taiz: "city of snipers".

History

Medieval

The first reference to Taiz in historical sources dates back to the first half of the 12th century CE, when the sultan of the Sulayhid dynasty, Abdullah bin Muhammad al-Sulayhi, built the Cairo Castle. Taiz first became an urbanized area during the days of his brother Ali bin Muhammad al-Sulayhi.

The next historical reference to Taiz mentioned that Queen Arwa al-Sulayhi's minister, Prince Al-Mansur bin Al-Mufaddal bin Abi Al-Barakat, sold many of the country's castles and cities - except for the fortresses of Taiz and Sabr - to the ruler of Aden Al-Zari'i, the preacher Muhammad Ibn Saba, in exchange for one hundred thousand dinars.

Turan-Shah, the older brother of Saladin, ruled the city after he conquered Yemen in 1173 CE. Turan-Shah built the citadel on the hill overlooking the old city. In 1175 CE, Taiz was made the capital of Yemen as it was incorporated into dominions of the Ayyubid dynasty by Turan-Shah.

Taiz's expansion accelerated when the Rasulid dynasty, which ruled Yemen from 1229-1454, took over the city. The second Rasulid King, Almaddhafar (1288 CE), moved his kingdom's capital from Sanaa to Taiz, due to its proximity to Aden.  Taiz was said to have reached its golden age during the Rasulid dynasty, whose sultans spent lavishly on palaces, mosques, and madrassas.} Its neighborhoods also teemed with schools, guesthouses, markets, orchards, and lush gardens, and the city was considered to be a center for the study of the Shafi'i school of Islamic jurisprudence.

In 1332 Ibn Battutah visited Taiz and described it as one of the largest and most beautiful cities of Yemen:
We went on ... to the town of Taʻizz, the capital of the king of Yemen, and one of the finest and largest towns in that country. Its people are overbearing, insolent, and rude, as is generally the case in towns where kings reside. Taʻizz is made up of three quarters; the first is the residence of the king and his court, the second, called ʽUdayna, is the military station, and the third, called al-Mahálib, is inhabited by the commonalty, and contains the principal market.

In 1500, the capital was moved to Sana'a by the ruler of the Taharid dynasty. In 1516 Taiz came under Ottoman control.

20th century
In 1918 the Ottomans lost Taiz to the newly independent Mutawakkilite Kingdom of Yemen.

Taiz remained a walled city until 1948, when Imam Ahmed made it the second capital of Yemen, allowing for expansion beyond its fortified wall. In the 1960s, the first purified water system in Yemen was opened in Taiz. In 1962, state administrations moved back to Sana'a.

Yemeni uprising and war
During the Yemeni Revolution fighting in Taiz resulted in anti-government forces seizing control of the city from president Ali Abdullah Saleh.

As part of the 2015 Yemeni Civil War, on 22 March 2015, the Houthis and forces loyal to former president Ali Abdullah Saleh took the city in the aftermath of their coup d'état in Sanaa. The city became the site of a military confrontation between Houthis and the forces loyal to Abd Rabbuh Mansur Hadi. The city was effectively under siege and the United Nations warned of an "extreme and irreversible" food shortage if fighting continued. In August 2015, Yemeni Member of Parliament Muhammad Muqbil Al-Himyari reported Houthi attacks on civilians in Taiz and appealed for help on Suhail TV (Yemen).

The 2015 confrontation expanded into a military campaign for control of this strategic city. Despite ceasefires and prisoner swaps, the battle continues to this day and the city has been described as a "volatile front line." The frontline runs through the city from east to west, and journeys across the frontline that once took 5 minutes now take 5 hours.

As of 2018, at least seven journalists had been killed in Taiz since the start of the war.

The fighting has also devastated Taiz's architectural heritage: Cairo Citadel was damaged by airstrikes in 2015, and the Taiz Museum was shelled in 2016, causing its manuscripts to be destroyed.

Geography

Climate
Taiz has a hot semi-arid climate (Köppen climate classification: BSh).

Landmarks

The city has many old quarters, with houses that are typically built with brown bricks, and mosques that are usually whitewashed. The most famous mosques in the city are the Ashrafiya, the Mua'tabiya Mosque, and the Mudhaffar Mosque.

Economy
Historically, the mountainous city of Taiz was known for coffee production. The Mocha coffee produced in Taiz was considered some of the finest in the region in the early 20th century. Today, coffee remains a major part of the economy but mango, pomegranate, citrus, banana, papai, vegetables, cereals, onions, and qat are also grown in the surrounding landscapes. Taiz is also known for its cheese. It is produced in rural areas like Araf, Awshaqh, Akhuz, Bargah, Barah, Jumah, Mukyas, Suayra, Kamb and Hajda and sold in Bab al-Kabeer and Bab Musa markets. Industries in the city of Taiz include cotton-weaving, tanning and jewelry production. 

However, since the outbreak of the civil war in 2015, Taiz's economy has been devastated by the fighting and the city's siege by Houthi rebels. Many goods are in short supply, and must be smuggled in across steep mountain roads to avoid sniper fire.

Transport
Taiz has many road connections with the rest of the country. However, as of January 2023, most roads to and from Ta'iz are controlled by the Houthis, who are besieging the city as part of the Yemeni Civil War. The city is served by Ta'izz International Airport.

Zoo
Like Sana'a Zoo, this zoo held fauna caught in the wild, such as the Arabian leopard, as well as exotic animals such as African lions and gazelles. Due to the civil war, however, many of the animals held at the zoo have become sick or died due to lack of food.

Notable people

 Tawakkol Karman , Yemeni Nobel Laureate, journalist, politician, and human rights activist.
 Amat Al Alim Alsoswa, journalist and Yemen's first female ambassador
 Abdel Karim al-Khaiwani, politician and human rights activist
 Bushra al-Maqtari, writer and activist
 Ali al-Muqri, novelist
 Maeen Abdulmalik Saeed, Yemeni prime minister
 Hisham Sharaf, Yemeni minister of foreign affairs
 Zayd Mutee' Dammaj, writer

See also
 Sarawat Mountains
 Haraz Mountains

References

External links

 

 
Capitals of former nations
Populated places in Taiz Governorate